Carleton Stevens Coon Jr. (1927December 3, 2018) was a career foreign service officer who served as the American Ambassador to Nepal.  At the time, his wife Jean (née Abell) served as Ambassador in Dacca, Bangladesh. He died on December 3, 2018 in Warrenton, Virginia.

Career
A Harvard grad (majoring in geography), Coon joined the Foreign Service upon graduating in 1949 and served in West Germany, Syria, India, Iran, Nepal and Morocco.

Personal life
Coon was the son of anthropologist Carleton S. Coon and his wife Mary.

References

1927 births
2018 deaths
Harvard College alumni
Ambassadors of the United States to Nepal
20th-century American diplomats